Elrington Halt station is a closed stone built railway station situated on a single track branch railway line in Northumberland, England, that ran from  through the Border Counties Junction to

History

Built to carry freight, primarily the product of local lead mines, the line eventually opened to passengers. The passenger service was run by the North Eastern Railway who took over the line in July 1876.

The station was unstaffed and renamed Elrington Halt in August 1926. It was closed to passengers in September 1930, and completely when the line closed on 20 November 1950. The station building remains as a private residence.

References

External links
Elrington Halt on Northumbrian Railways
Disused Stations 

Former North Eastern Railway (UK) stations
Railway stations in Great Britain opened in 1867
Railway stations in Great Britain closed in 1930
Disused railway stations in Northumberland